Dita Charanzová  (born 30 April 1975) is a Czech politician and diplomat who has served as Vice President of the European Parliament since 2019, and as a Member of the European Parliament (MEP) since 2014 for the ANO 2011 party. She has been a Vice President of the ALDE Party since 2018.

Early life and career 
Charanzová graduated from the University of Economics in Prague and from the Diplomatic School of Spain in Madrid. In 2001, she obtained a Ph.D. degree from the Faculty of International Relations at the University of Economics in Prague.

Charanzová worked in the diplomatic service of the Czech Republic for eight years, four of which she was posted in the Permanent Representation of the Czech Republic to the EU. During the Czech Presidency of the EU, she chaired the Trade Policy Committee of the Council of the European Union. Between 2000 and 2001, she participated in an EU project which was focused on the reform of public governance in the Czech Republic. During the same two years, she also served as an OSCE supervisor for election monitoring during the Kosovo elections.

In the past, she worked in Strasbourg as a TV Studio Manager during the sessions of the Parliamentary Assembly of the Council of Europe.

Political career 
In 2014, Charanzová ran for the elections to the European Parliament as an independent (non-party) candidate on the 3rd place from the list of candidates for ANO 2011 and was elected with a total number of 8,356 preferential votes (i.e. 3.41% of total votes).
In 2018, she was elected Vice President of the ALDE Party.

In the 2019 elections, Charanzová was re-elected to the European Parliament for a second term, with a total number of 53 924 preferential votes (i.e. 10.73% of total votes).[6] She has since been serving as one of the Parliament’s Vice-Presidents; in this capacity, she is part of the Parliament’s leadership under President David Sassoli.[7] In her role as Vice-President, Charanzová is responsible for the Security Policy of the European Parliament for relations with Latin America and a part of the Chancellery of the European Citizens’ Prize.

In the European Parliament, Charanzová is a member of the Renew Europe political group. She is the coordinator for Renew Europe in the Committee on the Internal Market and Consumer Protection (IMCO) and an active substitute member of the Committee on International Trade (INTA) and of the Special Committee on Artificial Intelligence in a Digital Age (AIDA).

Charanzová is also a member of the delegation for relations with the United States, the Delegation for the Euro-Latin American Parliamentary Assembly (Eurolat) and the Delegation for relations with Mercosur.

The main topics Charanzová deals with in the European Parliament are consumer protection, the digital economy international trade, and human rights. As a member of the IMCO Committee, she served as rapporteur on web accessibility. She has actively worked on the negotiations of new business opportunities for Czech and European companies, for instance in the US and Latin America, but also globally.

In 2015, Charanzová and Fernando Maura Barandiarán nominated the Democratic Unity Roundtable (MUD) for the Sakharov Prize for Freedom of Thought.

Other activities 
 European Council on Foreign Relations (ECFR), Member
 Board of Directors of the Aspen Institute, Member 
 Board of Trustees, World Law Foundation

Recognition 
In recognition of foreign policy activities, or more precisely, for promoting human rights, Charanzová was the first Czech MEP to win the MEP of the Year Award for 2016 in the category of foreign affairs in March 2016. She won the MEP of the Year Award in 2020 in the Internal Market and Consumer Protection category.

In 2016, Charanzová received the "New Europe 100" Prize awarded to persons from Central and Eastern Europe who have made a significant contribution to the digital development of the region. She was the first Czech MEP to receive this award in the history of the prize. In 2017, Politico listed Charanzová as one of the 41 most influential MEPs. In the same year, Politico also ranked her among the top 20 women who shape Brussels, and she was placed in the same ranking in 2018 and 2020 as well. Politico considers Charanzová as the leading woman on tech issues in the European Parliament at a time when the EU’s digital strategy has taken center stage.

In 2018, Czech Forbes ranked her within the top 10 in their list of the Top 100 most influential women.

In December 2020, Charanzová received the Internal Market & Consumer Protection award at The Parliament Magazine'''s annual MEP Awards.

 Personal life 
Charanzová and her partner have two daughters, Sophie and Mia. She is fluent in Czech, English, French, Spanish and Russian.

 Publications 
Charanzová is the author of various publications that deal with European issues. These include: 
 Charanzová, Dita. Surovinové strategie Evropské unie: globální a domácí výzvy.
 Charanzová, Dita. Salvador de Madariaga''. Velcí Evropané.

External links 
  European Parliament Webpage
  Personal website

References 

1975 births
ANO 2011 MEPs
Women MEPs for the Czech Republic
Living people
MEPs for the Czech Republic 2014–2019
Politicians from Prague
Prague University of Economics and Business alumni
MEPs for the Czech Republic 2019–2024